The Kırbıyık Holding Stadium is a multi-purpose stadium in Alanya, Turkey. It is currently used mostly for football matches and is the home ground of Süper Lig team Alanyaspor.

The stadium was built in 2011 and currently holds 10,130, all seated.

References

External links
http://www.worldstadiums.com/stadium_pictures/middle_east/turkey/mediterranean/alanya_oba.shtml

Süper Lig venues
Football venues in Turkey
Multi-purpose stadiums in Turkey
Sports venues completed in 2011
Alanyaspor
2011 establishments in Turkey
Sports venues in Antalya